Marek Baránek (born March 1, 1995) is a Czech professional ice hockey player. He is currently playing for Rytíři Kladno in the Czech Extraliga (ELH).

Baránek made his Czech Extraliga debut playing with HC Litvínov during the 2014–15 Czech Extraliga season.

Career statistics

Regular season and playoffs

International

References

External links

1995 births
Living people
Czech ice hockey defencemen
Sportspeople from Ústí nad Labem
HC Litvínov players
HC Karlovy Vary players
HC Dukla Jihlava players
HC Košice players
Rytíři Kladno players
Czech expatriate ice hockey players in Slovakia